Les Strayhorn (born September 1, 1951) is a former professional American football running back in the National Football League for the Dallas Cowboys. He also played in the Canadian Football League for the Hamilton Tiger-Cats and Montreal Alouettes. He played college football at East Carolina University.

Early years
Strayhorn attended Jones High School in Trenton, North Carolina. He accepted a scholarship from East Carolina University.

Although he was hampered by a severe shoulder injury early in his college career, he was able to overcome it and become a three-year starter at running back. He finished his college career with 373 carries for 1,673 yards, a 4.5-yard average and 8 touchdowns.

Professional career

Dallas Cowboys
Strayhorn was selected by the Dallas Cowboys in the seventeenth round (438th overall) of the 1973 NFL Draft. In 1974, he was a backup at fullback. He played 2 seasons, while suiting up for 24 games, rushing for 128 yards with a 5.8-yard average and one touchdown. He was waived on September 9, 1975.

Hamilton Tiger-Cats (CFL)
In 1975, he was signed by the Hamilton Tiger-Cats of the Canadian Football League. He played 2 seasons, rushing for 342 yards and one touchdown. On August 6, 1976, he was released to make room for running back Jimmy De Ratt.

Montreal Alouettes (CFL)
In 1976, he was signed by the Montreal Alouettes based on a recommendation from Tom Landry, who at the time were coached by future hall of famer Marv Levy. On July 5, 1977, he tore ligaments in his left knee and was lost for the season, still, he was a part of the Grey Cup championship team.

Personal life
After football, he worked in the New Hanover County Department of Social Services. His brother Ken also played football at East Carolina University.

References

External links
Professional career stats
College career stats

1951 births
Living people
People from Jones County, North Carolina
Players of American football from North Carolina
African-American players of Canadian football
East Carolina Pirates football players
Dallas Cowboys players
Hamilton Tiger-Cats players
Montreal Alouettes players
21st-century African-American people
20th-century African-American sportspeople